Daysy María Jesús Bareiro Martínez (born 19 January 2001) is a Paraguayan footballer who plays as a defender for Spanish Primera Federación club CD Juan Grande and the Paraguay women's national team.

References

External links
Daysy Bareiro at BDFútbol

2001 births
Living people
Sportspeople from Asunción
Paraguayan women's footballers
Women's association football defenders
Cerro Porteño players
Club Sol de América footballers
Segunda Federación (women) players
Paraguay women's international footballers
Pan American Games competitors for Paraguay
Footballers at the 2019 Pan American Games
Paraguayan expatriate women's footballers
Paraguayan expatriate sportspeople in Spain
Expatriate women's footballers in Spain
21st-century Paraguayan women